Hernst Marktl (23 June 1887 – ?) was a German footballer who played as a defender. Throughout his club career, he played for Italian side Internazionale, also serving as the team's captain.

External links 
Interfc.it 

1887 births
Year of death missing
German footballers
Association football defenders
Inter Milan players